The Tupolev ANT-43 was an experimental passenger aircraft designed and built by the Tupolev Design Bureau in the 1930s.

Design and development
The ANT-43 was a seven-passenger, low-wing monoplane design of all-metal construction, bearing resemblance to the Tupolev ANT-31 (I-14) fighter. Intended as an HQ liaison aircraft, it was conceived using a stencil-based template design method rather than project drawings, and construction of the prototype was undertaken 1935-1936. Due to concerns about weaknesses in the ANT-43's airframe construction, when the ANT-43 prototype was completed, TsAGI summoned a commission led by Viktor N. Belyayev to decide whether the ANT-43 was fit for flight testing. The commission, deciding that the ANT-43 prototype did not meet structural strength norms, refused to approve flight tests for the aircraft, and the ANT-43 was scrapped without ever being flown.

Specifications

References 

1930s Soviet experimental aircraft
Tupolev aircraft
1930s Soviet military utility aircraft